Lisel Mueller (born Elisabeth Neumann, February 8, 1924 – February 21, 2020) was a German-born American poet, translator and academic teacher. Her family fled the Nazi regime, and she arrived in the U.S. in 1939 at the age of 15. She worked as a literary critic and taught at the University of Chicago, Elmhurst College and Goddard College. She began writing poetry in the 1950s and published her first collection in 1965, after years of self-study. She received awards including the National Book Award in 1981 and the Pulitzer Prize for Poetry in 1997, as the only German-born poet awarded that prize.

Life and career 
Mueller was born Elisabeth Neumann in Hamburg. Her father, Fritz C. Neumann, was a high school teacher at the Gymnasium Alstertal. A progressive educator, he delivered a speech in 1933 to an assembly of Hamburg teachers, warning of the dangers of Nazi ideology. When the Nazis came to power, he was dismissed. Her mother, Ilse (Burmester), an elementary teacher, sustained the family. In 1935, her father was interrogated by the Gestapo for four days. He emigrated, first to Italy, then to the U.S., where he was accepted in 1937 as a political refugee. He became a professor of French and German at Evansville College. She followed with her mother and her younger sister Ingeborg, arriving on 9 June 1939. In the U.S., she used the name Lisel. She graduated from the University of Evansville in 1944. Her mother died in 1953, and she then began to write poetry, publishing the first small collection, Dependencies, in 1965 after twelve years of self-studies.

In 1943, she married Paul Mueller. The couple built a home in the Chicago suburb of Lake Forest, Illinois, in the 1960s, and she wrote: "Though my family landed in the Midwest, we lived in urban or suburban environments." They raised two daughters, Lucy and Jenny. She made money by working as a receptionist in a doctor's office and writing book reviews for the Chicago Daily News, which hired her in the 1970s.

Mueller taught at the University of Chicago, Elmhurst College in Illinois, Goddard College in Plainfield, Vermont, and Warren Wilson College. She stopped publishing after her husband died in 2001 and her vision deteriorated.

During her last years, Mueller resided in a retirement community in Chicago, Illinois. She died on February 21, 2020, at the age of 96.

Books

Poetry 
Mueller's poems often depart from seemingly simple observations. While her work is in English, it reflects her German roots. She sometimes alludes to German fairy-tales by the Brothers Grimm, and quotes Bertold Brecht. In her 1992 autobiographical poem "Curriculum Vitae", she writes: "My country was struck by history more deadly than earthquakes or hurricanes".

Her poems have been described as extremely accessible, yet intricate and layered. While at times whimsical and possessing a sly humor, there is an underlying sadness in much of her work.
 Dependencies (1965)
 Life of a Queen (1970) by Northeast/Juniper Books
 The Private Life (1975) Lamont Poetry Selection
 Voices from the Forest (1977)
 The Need to Hold Still (1980) — winner of the National Book Award
 Second Language (1986)
 Waving from Shore (1989)
 Learning to Play by Ear (1990)
 Alive Together: New & Selected Poems (1996) — winner of the Pulitzer Prize

Translation 
She published several volumes of translation, including
 Selected Later Poems of Marie Luise Kaschnitz (1980)
 Circe's Mountain, stories by Marie Luise Kaschnitz (1990)

Awards 
 1975: Lamont Poetry Prize for The Private Life
 1981: National Book Award for Poetry for The Need to Hold Still
 1990: Carl Sandburg Award
 1990: National Endowment for the Arts fellowship
 1997: Pulitzer Prize for Poetry for Alive Together: New & Selected Poems
 2002: Ruth Lilly Poetry Prize (2002)
 2019: Order of Merit of the Federal Republic of Germany

References

External links
 
 "Poems by Lisel Mueller" plagiarist.com
 Martha Minow: "Reading the Brothers Grimm to Jenny" in Making All the Difference: Inclusion, Exclusion, and American Law, Cornell University Press, 2016
 "Another Version" and "Scenic Route"
 "Hope" writersalmanac.org
 "Monet Refuses the Operation" civicreflection.org
 "Things" poetryfoundation.org

1924 births
2020 deaths
German emigrants to the United States
Poets from Illinois
Goddard College alumni
National Book Award winners
Writers from Hamburg
People from Lake Forest, Illinois
Pulitzer Prize for Poetry winners
Recipients of the Cross of the Order of Merit of the Federal Republic of Germany
American women poets
20th-century American poets
20th-century American translators
20th-century American women writers
21st-century American poets
21st-century American women writers